

Events
The Commission is developed in The Atlantic City hotel by "Lucky" Luciano, Meyer Lansky, and The Five Families
The Castellammarese War continues as mob boss Joe Masseria offers to negotiate with his rival, Salvatore Maranzano. Maranzano and the Castellammarese faction refuse to end the war, demanding the death of Masseria ally Joe "The Baker" Catania. Although Catania would be murdered later in 1931, the war would continue.
Mobster Salvatore Sabella is arrested for assault and battery using a motor vehicle; however, he receives a suspended sentence. During his indictment, New Jersey police discover that his address matches that of Stefano Magaddino, leader of the Buffalo crime family, following Magaddino's arrest in 1921. Shortly after his arrest, the 40-year-old Sabella retires as leader of the Philadelphia crime syndicate in favor of lieutenant John Avena.
Charles Entratta, a partner of New York gangster Jack "Legs" Diamond is gunned down in a Brooklyn neighborhood.
February 3 – Joe Catania is killed as he leaves his home in New York. It is thought that Masseria ordered Catena's murder out of suspicion that he was hijacking Masseria's liquor shipments.
April 15 – Mob boss Joe Masseria is killed by Joe Adonis, Vito Genovese, Albert Anastasia, and Bugsy Siegel on the orders of Lucky Luciano. Ciro Terranova drives the getaway car.  This effectively ends the long Castellammarese War in New York.
May – Following Masseria's death, Salvatore Maranzano declares himself capo di tutti capi (boss of bosses) during a mob conference in Chicago, Illinois. While the conference was to serve as a reconciliation with Al Capone's Chicago Outfit, ally Charles Luciano and others conspire to eliminate Maranzano.
September 10 – On orders of Charles Luciano and Frank Costello, boss of all bosses Salvatore Maranzano is murdered in his headquarters on Park Avenue in Manhattan by gangsters disguised as police officers. That same day, several of Maranzano's lieutenants, including James Marino, are killed by unknown gunmen including outside a Bronx neighborhood barbershop.  The bodies of Maranzano allies Samuel Monaco and Louis Russo would later be recovered from Newark Bay; both corpses would show signs of torture. These events may or may not have been the basis for the beginning of the alleged "Night of the Sicilian Vespers" in which many old world Sicilian-born mafiosi are killed throughout the country by the Luciano-Lansky faction in the aftermath of the Castellammarese War.
September 13 – Joseph Siragusa, leader of the Pittsburgh crime family, is shot to death in his home.  He is succeeded by John Bazzano.
September 17 – Meyer Shapiro, who controls bootlegging, illegal gambling and prostitution in New York's East Side, is murdered by former associates Abe "Kid Twist" Reles and Martin "Bugsy" Goldstein, who quickly take control of his criminal operations. His younger brother Irving was previously killed outside his Bronx apartment on July 11. One year later, Willie Shapiro would also be killed, buried alive by Reles and his associates.
October 15 – Joe Ardizonne, head of the Los Angeles crime family, disappears and is presumed murdered (possibly a victim of the "Night of the Sicilian Vespers"). Mobster Jack Dragna {died 1956} would go on to succeed Ardizzone as leader of the Los Angeles family.
October 17 – Al Capone is sentenced to 11 years in prison for tax evasion and fined $80,000
December 18 – New York Prohibition gangster Jack "Legs" Diamond is shot to death while staying at a safe house in Albany, New York by a number of unidentified gunman.
December 22 – Irish-American mob boss Frankie Wallace, on the pretense of a sit-down with Italian-American mobsters, is ambushed and murdered in Boston's North End. The Gustin Gang would be the first victims in a three-year systematic elimination of Irish-American gangsters in the United States.

Arts and literature
Little Caesar (film)  starring Edward G. Robinson
The Public Enemy (film)  starring James Cagney
Smart Money (film)  starring Edward G. Robinson and James Cagney
Road to Perdition starring Tom Hanks, Paul Newman, Jude Law, and Daniel Craig
 Season 5 of HBO's Boardwalk Empire

Births
Vincent Napoli, Gambino crime family member and Brooklyn drug smuggler
Leonard Teperow, West Roxbury bookmaker and Mafia associate
Al Tornabene "Pizza Al", Chicago Outfit boss
March 19 – Robert Trimbole, Australian drug baron and organized crime leader.
September 30 – Giuseppe Calò "The Banker", Sicilian mafioso

Deaths
Charles Entratta "Charlie Green", New York mobster and associate of Jack Diamond
February 3 – Joe Catania, New York mobster and a lieutenant to Joe Masseria
April 15 – Giuseppe Masseria "Joe the Boss", New York mobster, boss of bosses
May 8 – Sam Carlino Underboss to brother Pete Carlino of Colorado's Bootleg gang.
July 11 – Irving Shapiro, New York (East Side) mobster
September 10 – Salvatore Maranzano, New York mobster, boss of bosses
September 10 – Pete Carlino, Head of Colorado bootleggers.
September 10 – James Marino (James LaPore), Salvatore Marranzano lieutenant
September 10 – Samuel Monaco, Salvatore Maranzano ally and New Jersey underboss
September 10 – Louis Russo, Salvatore Maranzano ally and New Jersey consigliere
September 13 – Joseph Siragusa, leader of the Pittsburgh crime family
September 17 – Meyer Shapiro, New York (East Side) mobster
October 15 – Joseph Ardizzone, Los Angeles crime family boss
December 22 – Frankie Wallace, Boston mobster and leader of the Gustin Gang
December 22 – Barney (Dodo) Walsh, Boston mobster and member of the Gustin Gang

Years in organized crime
Organized crime